Timothy John Daniels (born 24 October 1980) is an English former cricketer.  Daniels is a right-handed batsman who fields as a wicket-keeper.  He was born at Brighton, Sussex.

While studying for a degree at the University of Oxford, Daniels made his first-class debut for Oxford UCCE against Warwickshire in 2001.  The following season he made two further first-class appearances against Worcestershire and Gloucestershire.  Daniels struggled in his three first-class matches, scoring just 18 runs at an average of 3.60, with a high score of 16.  Behind the stumps he took 5 catches and made 3 stumpings.

References

External links
Tim Daniels at ESPNcricinfo
Tim Daniels at CricketArchive

1980 births
Living people
Sportspeople from Brighton
Alumni of the University of Oxford
English cricketers
Oxford MCCU cricketers
Wicket-keepers